Hashkova (also Romanized as Ḩashkovā and Hashkava; also known as Ḩashgevā and Khashkava) is a village in Belesbeneh Rural District, Kuchesfahan District, Rasht County, Gilan Province, Iran. At the 2006 census, its population was 1,078, in 316 families.

References 

Populated places in Rasht County